San Jose de los Duranes Chapel is a historic building in Albuquerque, New Mexico. The chapel was built around 1890 to serve the community of Los Duranes, one of several outlying plazas spread along the Rio Grande in the vicinity of the main plaza at Old Town Albuquerque. The chapel was replaced with a new, larger San Jose Church in the 1960s, and fell into disrepair. In 1982–4, community members undertook a restoration of the building, replacing damaged or missing pews, rails, and doors, plastering the walls, repairing holes, and reinstalling the original religious artwork including paintings of the Crucifixion and a santo depicting St. Joseph. It was listed on the New Mexico State Register of Cultural Properties in 1983 and the National Register of Historic Places in 1984.

The chapel is a one-story adobe building in the New Mexico vernacular style. It is approximately rectangular in plan with a polygonal apse and a small shed-roofed wing on the north side containing the sacristy. The building has a corrugated metal gable roof with a wooden-shingled gable end at the front and a three-sided hipped section at the apse end. The main entrance at the front of the building has wooden double doors underneath a wooden cross and a small belfry. The original bell was stolen, but it was replaced with a new bell during the 1980s restoration.

References

Churches on the National Register of Historic Places in New Mexico
National Register of Historic Places in Albuquerque, New Mexico
Roman Catholic churches in Albuquerque, New Mexico
New Mexico State Register of Cultural Properties